For the Australian band, see The Blackeyed Susans.

Blackeyed Susan was an American rock band from Philadelphia active between 1990 and 1992. The band was formed by singer and guitarist "Dizzy" Dean Davidson after he left Britny Fox.

History 
Blackeyed Susan was formed in 1990 by ex-Britny Fox frontman Dean Davidson. Davidson brought in former Cinderella keyboardist Rick Criniti to play guitar. Bassist Erik Levy and drummer Chris Branco rounded out the line-up. Compared to Britny Fox, Blackeyed Susan showed a more blues rock influenced sound than the bawdy glam metal of the former. The band released their first album, Electric Rattlebone, on Mercury Records in 1991. The album was a commercial failure, and Mercury pulled their support for the band while they were on tour. During the supporting tour, Rick Crintini was replaced by Jimmy Marchiano. Blackeyed Susan began working on a followup to Electric Rattlebone called Just A Taste in 1992, but the album ultimately became a demo.

Members 
 Dean Davidson- Vocals, guitar, harmonica
 Erik Levy- Bass, backing vocals
 Walter Williams- Bass, backing vocals
 Rick Crintini- Guitar, vocals, folk instruments
 Chris Branco- Drums, percussion 
 Dave Barlow- Keyboards, backing vocals, folk instruments
 Jimmy Marchiano- Guitar, vocals
 Jeff Cease- Guitar
 Joey Marchiano- Drums

Discography 
 Electric Rattlebone (1991, Mercury)
 Just A Taste (1992, self-released)

References

Rock music groups from Pennsylvania
Musical groups from Philadelphia
Musical groups established in 1990
Musical groups disestablished in 1992
Mercury Records artists